"Ouroboros" is the third episode of science fiction sitcom Red Dwarf Series VII and the 39th in the series run. It was first broadcast on the British television channel BBC2 on 31 January 1997. Written by Doug Naylor and directed by Ed Bye, it was the first episode not to feature Arnold Rimmer (although he does make a minor cameo in a flashback), and also the first to feature Kristine Kochanski as a regular character, having only appeared previously as a minor recurring character.

Plot
This episode opens with a flashback to the Aigburth Arms pub, in Liverpool, 2155, where we see a man named Frank discovering a baby in a box under the pool table. On the box is written "OUROB OROS": the barmaid deplores the fact that his unknown parents could not even decide what name to give him (or how to spell it), interpreting the writing as a misspelling of "our Rob or Ross". The barmaid declares   

Back in the present, on Starbug, Kryten (Robert Llewellyn) shows Lister (Craig Charles) that he has found some new clothes for him, including a rather feminine looking dressing gown, which he says he can alter so that Lister can wear it. Cat (Danny John-Jules) comes in and tells them there is something strange on the scan, but he's reluctant to commit himself as to whether it's a "wibbly thing" or a "swirly thing".  In the drive room, Lister, Kryten and the Cat see that what is before them is a sort of temporal disturbance. There is no way to outrun it, and so they head straight into it.

As they pass through it, they discover a temporal rift in normal space, through which they encounter an alternative Red Dwarf crew, with some small differences: in this reality, it is Lister who is the hologram, having failed to survive the accident that wiped out the crew. He explains to our Lister that in their reality, Kochanski (Chloë Annett) found out that he had smuggled Frankenstein on board ship and took the cat away from him. As a result, Lister was not put into stasis, as he was not caught breaking quarantine regulations. In fact, it was Kochanski who ended up in stasis, and to Lister's delight, she is alive, and with the alternative crew. Rimmer is not, of course, Lister having been brought back as a hologram to keep Kochanski sane. Kryten is there, and the Cat is there as well.

On meeting, Kochanski asks Lister if he would not mind doing something for her, as she wants one day to have children... unfortunately for Dave, she is not thinking about sex, but instead wants him to deposit a sperm sample into the invitro tube she hands him, which already has her sample in it. Just then the temporal rift is broken as a GELF warship attacks the link and breaks it. Kochanski nearly falls through the link into the endless void of non-space; however she is saved by the crew of Starbug, yet ends up on the wrong side of the link and falls unconscious.

Waking on Starbug, Kochanski smothers Lister with kisses, thinking he is her Lister, and old Dave is not too eager to point out her error, though Kryten does try, to no avail. Heading to the cockpit, the crew finds that the GELFs are after Lister in order to return him to his wife. Kochanski uses her advanced knowledge to help them to lose the pursuing GELF ship, leading it down onto an asteroid, where it crashes. Lister tells her that they cannot re-establish the link with her ship's reality, so she's stuck with them for the moment and if they do not find the temporal disturbance in time she'll be stuck. Kochanski is less than happy about this, and bends all her efforts towards finding the spatial co-ordinates that will allow them to relink. Kryten meanwhile worries that Kochanski is going to end up staying, and will eventually take Lister away from him.  He becomes quite hysterical as he yells that he might be alone again like he was on the Nova 5, but Lister points out that he killed the crew (as was read in the book Infinity Welcomes Careful Drivers that he put water on the computers of the Nova 5, causing it to crash). Then Kryten laments how the S.S. Augustus crew left him alone, before he went on the Nova 5. But Lister protests that they died of old age.

As they try to re-establish the link, Kochanski tells Kryten that she knows he doesn't like her, and Kryten tells her that she is not good enough for Lister. In the middle of the argument however the link is found again, and it looks like Kochanski will be able to leave. Kryten is delighted, and so is Kochanski. Lister has a last few minutes with Kristine before she leaves, and gives her the tube with his sample in it. Lister explains that the reason why he spent most of his early life drifting was because he didn't have anything to look to as he didn't know who he was or where he came from. Kochanski consoles Lister by promising him to tell their child all about him, so that it doesn't grow up thinking its parents deserted it, as his own did.

As Kochanski prepares to leave, she says that it may be possible to communicate transdimensionally, via the cellular phone she carries. As they load aboard some supplies from Kochanski's ship, Lister sees a crate with a strange symbol and asks about it. Kryten explains that the symbol, a snake eating its own tail, represents infinity. The symbol is on the crate because it contained everlasting batteries... called Ouroboros batteries, Ouroboros being the name of the symbol. Lister realises that the box he was found in didn't say "our Rob or Ross" but "Ouroboros" and suddenly works out the mystery behind his abandonment. The invitro tube Kochanski has is Lister himself, and at some point after the baby is born he will need to go back in time and leave him at the Aigburth Arms, writing "Ouroboros" on the box so he would be able to work it out at this point in time. Lister begins to try and come to terms with the fact that he is his own father, and Kochanski is not only his ex-girlfriend but also his mother, before realizing he needs to get the tube back from Kochanski.

Unfortunately, as he runs to Kochanski to get the tube, the GELFs attack again and the link breaks with Kochanski stuck on the wrong side. She decides to try to jump the gap back to her shipmates but doesn't make it and falls short, plunging into non-space. She then uses the transdimensional communication properties of the telephone she has to contact Lister and tell him that she will stay with him after all, if he can save her. Knowing his whole existence depends on saving Kochanski, Lister uses a crossbow and some rope taken from her own ship's supplies and does exactly that... but in so doing shoots the harpoon into her leg, causing her to make an obscenity-laden phone call to him. In the medibay later, Kochanski becomes determined to find some way back to her crew but a devastated Kryten tells her the dimension gateway is closed for good. Despite his misgivings, Kryten welcomes her aboard.

Eighteen months later, Lister uses the time drive to send himself and his baby son back to the Aigburth Arms in 2155. He explains to the baby that he is not being abandoned like he'll believe for many years but is instead being placed there to maintain the unbreakable circle. Now these events will always repeat themselves, and through that the human race will never truly become extinct. After bidding his child goodbye, Lister puts him under the pool table in a box marked 'Ouroboros' and leaves seconds before Frank walks in...

Production
The episode overran by a few minutes, and had to be cut down. Rather than lose vital scenes, it was decided that the opening titles would be omitted to save precious time. The scenes would be reinstated for the X-tended edition on VHS release. This is the second episode of Red Dwarf to forfeit the opening titles for the purposes of time and episode pacing (the first being the series II closer "Parallel Universe").

Guest stars included Gary Bleasdale as Frank, Juliet Griffiths as Barmaid, Adrienne Posta as Flight Announcer and Alexander John-Jules (Danny John-Jules' nephew) as "Baby Lister".

The Aigburth Arms (where the opening scene takes place) is named after a real Liverpool pub which Rob Grant and Doug Naylor used to frequent. It is now called "The Victoria".

Reception
"Ouroboros" was the first episode to feature Kristine Kochanski as a regular character. One reviewer said that "Chloe Annett as Krisine Kochanski ... proved a wonderful choice. Annett's presence ... provided balance for the reduced role of Rimmer." However, DVDActive called Ouroborus "the weakest episode" of the series, and noted that Kryten's more neurotic personality traits were "initially interesting [but] the sight of a blubbing robot gets very irritating very quickly." Sci-Fi Online liked the episode, and thought that it "contains a great central concept and impressive model and CGI effects."

See also
 Ouroboros
Other stories featuring characters descended from themself:
 "—All You Zombies—", a short story by Robert Heinlein
 The Man Who Folded Himself, a novel by David Gerrold
 "Roswell That Ends Well", an episode of Futurama
 "Trials and Tribble-ations", an episode of Star Trek: Deep Space Nine, includes a scene where Dr. Julian Bashir discusses this concept

References

External links

 
 
 Series VII episode guide at www.reddwarf.co.uk

Red Dwarf VII episodes
1997 British television episodes
Television episodes about time travel